Ten national teams will compete in the women's field hockey tournament at the 2018 Asian Games in Indonesia. A maximum of eighteen players were officially enrolled in each squad.

Pool A

The following is the China roster in the women's field hockey tournament of the 2018 Asian Games.

Head coach:  Jamilon Mülders

Gu Bingfeng
Song Xiaoming
Li Jiaqi
Cui Qiuxia (C)
Zhou Yu
Peng Yang
Liang Meiyu
Li Hong
Zhang Jinrong
Ou Zixia
Zhang Xiaoxue
He Jiangxin
Chen Yi (GK)
De Jiaojiao
Xi Xiayun
Chen Yi
Dan Wen
Ye Jiao (GK)

The following is the Japan roster in the women's field hockey tournament of the 2018 Asian Games.

Head coach:  Anthony Farry

Megumi Kageyama (GK)
Natsuki Naito
Akiko Ota
Emi Nishikori
Shihori Oikawa
Kimika Hoshi
Mayumi Ono
Yukari Mano
Akiko Kato
Hazuki Nagai
Minami Shimizu
Yuri Nagai
Aki Yamada
Maho Segawa
Yui Ishibashi
Mami Karino
Motomi Kawamura (C)
Akio Tanaka (GK)

The following is the Malaysia roster in the women's field hockey tournament of the 2018 Asian Games.

Head coach:  Dharma Raj Abdullah

Farah Yahya (GK)
Nuraini Rashid
<li value=3>Nuraslinda Said
<li value=5>Hasliza Ali
<li value=6>Norsharina Shabuddin
<li value=7>Siti Ruhani (C)
<li value=8>Juliani Din
<li value=11>Norazlin Sumantri
<li value=12>Hanis Onn
<li value=13>Surizan Awang
<li value=14>Zafirah Aziz
<li value=15>Syafiqah Zain
<li value=16>Huzaimah Aziz (GK)
<li value=19>Fazilla Sylvester
<li value=20>Norfaiezah Saiuti
<li value=21>Fatin Sukri
<li value=26>Nuramirah Zulkifli
<li value=29>Kirandeep Kaur

{{fhw|HKG}}
The following is the Hong Kong roster in the women's field hockey tournament of the 2018 Asian Games.

Head coach:  Arif Ali

<li value=1>Yip Ting Wai (GK)
<li value=2>Chan Yi Man
<li value=3>Tiffany Chan
<li value=4>Katherine Mountain
<li value=5>Evelyn Cheung
<li value=6>Wong Wai Ki
<li value=7>Chan Chi
<li value=8>Melvina Cheng
<li value=9>Weeraya Ho
<li value=10>Chan Ching Nam
<li value=11>Chuen Sze Sze
<li value=12>Ngan Yuet
<li value=13>Patricia Chiu
<li value=14>Lau Pui Sze
<li value=15>Lo I Ka (C)
<li value=16>Hong Ka Man (GK)
<li value=17>Melissa Law Ka Mun
<li value=18>Olivia Chiu

{{fhw|TPE}}
The following is the Chinese Taipei roster in the women's field hockey tournament of the 2018 Asian Games.

Head coach:  Su Chih-hua

<li value=1>Chang Chia-yi (GK)
<li value=2>Yang Chun-hui
<li value=3>Chen Tsai-yu
<li value=4>Liu Li-yen
<li value=5>Chen Ying-li
<li value=6>Yang Chia-yu
<li value=11>Tseng Wan-ju (C)
<li value=12>Su Chieh-yu
<li value=13>Shih Shu-hsin
<li value=16>Wang Shih-hsin
<li value=17>Lin Ting-yun
<li value=18>Lin Chia-jung (GK)
<li value=20>Cheng I-lun
<li value=21>Liao Pei-shan
<li value=23>Liu Kuan-yu

Pool B

{{fhw|KOR}}
The following is the South Korea roster in the women's field hockey tournament of the 2018 Asian Games.

Head coach:  Huh Sang-young

<li value=1>Jang Soo-ji (GK)
<li value=2>Choi Su-ji
<li value=4>Kim Young-ran (C)
<li value=5>Lee Yu-rim
<li value=8>An Hyo-ju
<li value=10>Park Mi-hyun
<li value=11>Park Seung-a
<li value=12>Lee Young-sil
<li value=13>Cho Eun-ji
<li value=14>Cho Yun-kyoung
<li value=16>Cheon Seul-ki
<li value=17>Kim Ok-ju
<li value=18>Kim Bo-mi
<li value=19>Cho Hye-jin
<li value=21>Shin Hye-jeong
<li value=22>Jang Hee-sun
<li value=23>Lee Yu-ri
<li value=31>Hwang Hyeon-a (GK)

{{fhw|IND}}
The following is the India roster in the women's field hockey tournament of the 2018 Asian Games.

Head coach:  Sjoerd Marijne

<li value=1>Navjot Kaur
<li value=2>Gurjit Kaur
<li value=3>Deep Grace Ekka
<li value=4>Monika Malik
<li value=6>Reena Khokhar
<li value=8>Nikki Pradhan
<li value=11>Savita Punia (GK)
<li value=13>Rajani Etimarpu (GK)
<li value=16>Vandana Katariya
<li value=17>Deepika Thakur
<li value=18>Udita
<li value=19>Namita Toppo
<li value=20>Lalremsiami
<li value=25>Navneet Kaur
<li value=26>Sunita Lakra
<li value=28>Rani Rampal (C)
<li value=31>Lilima Minz
<li value=32>Neha Goyal

{{fhw|THA}}
The following is the Thailand roster in the women's field hockey tournament of the 2018 Asian Games.

Head coach:  Bae Young-wook

<li value=1>Alisa Narueangram (GK)
<li value=2>Pornsuree Toemsombatbowon
<li value=3>Suwapat Konthong
<li value=4>Kanyanat Nakpolkrung
<li value=5>Sirikwan Wongkeaw
<li value=6>Onuma Doungsuda
<li value=7>Tikhamporn Sakunpithak
<li value=8>Jenjira Inpa
<li value=9>Khwanchanok Suksin
<li value=10>Thanaporn Tongkham
<li value=11>Natthakarn Aunjai
<li value=12>Nasha Jutawijittam
<li value=13>Supansa Samanso (C)
<li value=14>Manassaree Prasanpim
<li value=15>Mutmee Maneepura
<li value=16>Anongnat Piresram
<li value=17>Kornkanok Sanpoung
<li value=18>Siraya Yimkrajang (GK)

{{fhw|KAZ}}
The following is the Kazakhstan roster in the women's field hockey tournament of the 2018 Asian Games.

Head coach:  Nurzhan Beibitov

<li value=1>Guzal Bakhavaddin(GK)
<li value=2>Assel Mukasheva
<li value=3>Dilnaz Khairusheva
<li value=4>Natalya Sazontova
<li value=5>Alina Bissirova
<li value=6>Nagima Koishybek
<li value=7>Viktoriya Lyapina
<li value=8>Sabina Nursilanova
<li value=9>Karina Kassumova
<li value=10>Vera Domashneva
<li value=11>Elvira Utigenova
<li value=12>Malida Srazhaddinova
<li value=13>Alissa Chepkassova
<li value=14>Irina Dobrioglo
<li value=15>Natalya Gataulina (C)
<li value=16>Alexandra Lipunova 
<li value=17>Symbat Sabazova

{{fhw|INA}}
The following is the Indonesia roster in the women's field hockey tournament of the 2018 Asian Games.

Head coach:  Lim Chiow Chuan

[[Selly Florentina]] (GK)
<li value=2>[[Irianti Ratnaningsih]]
<li value=5>[[Tiffani Makharti]]
<li value=7>[[Lispa]]
<li value=8>[[Yuanita Suwito]]
<li value=9>[[Masriana]]
<li value=10>[[Nur Anisa]]
<li value=11>[[Ira Juarsyi]]
<li value=12>[[Rwede Sawor]]
<li value=13>[[Diana Nazar]]
<li value=14>[[Melinda (field hockey)|Melinda]]
<li value=15>[[Sismiya Kadarisma]]
<li value=17>[[Annur El-Islamy]]
<li value=22>[[Aulia Arindah]]
<li value=23>[[Feriana (field hockey)|Feriana]] (C)
<li value=25>[[Olevia Kbarek]] 
<li value=28>[[Rayhan Uno]]
<li value=30>[[Sarah Amaniah]] (GK)
{{div col end}}<section end="Indonesia" />

References
{{reflist|30em}}

[[Category:Field hockey at the 2018 Asian Games – Women's tournament|Squads]]
{{DEFAULTSORT:Field hockey at the 2018 Asian Games - Women's team squads}}